"Eleven" is a song by American singer Khalid, released on January 11, 2020, from RCA Records. Its remix features American R&B singer Summer Walker, who co-wrote the song alongside Jamil "Digi" Chammas and Simon Says, who also produced the track.

Charts

Certifications

References

2020 songs
2020 singles
Khalid (singer) songs
Songs written by Khalid (singer)